The Open Data Description Language (OpenDDL) is a generic text-based language that is designed to store arbitrary data in a concise human-readable format. It can be used as a means for easily exchanging information among many programs or simply as a method for storing a program's data in an editable format.

The exact syntax of OpenDDL is described on the website openddl.org as well as in an appendix of the Open Game Engine Exchange Specification.

Structures 

An OpenDDL file is composed of a sequence of structures that can be either user-defined types or built-in primitive data types. The declaration of a structure consists of an identifier followed by an optional name, an optional property list, and finally, the structure's contents enclosed in braces. Raw data is always contained within structures whose identifiers are one of the data types described in the next section. For example, one may define a Point structure that holds the floating-point coordinates of a three-dimensional point as follows.

 Point
 {
    float {1.0, 2.0, 3.0}
 }

Structures can have names that allow them to be referenced from other parts of the file. Names can be global (unique throughout the file) or local (unique within the enclosing structure). A global name consists of a dollar sign followed by an identifier, and a local name consists of a percent sign followed by a dollar sign. The Point structure above could be given the global name "position" as follows.

 Point $position
 {
    float {1.0, 2.0, 3.0}
 }

Another structure could then include a reference to this point by using the ref data type:

 ref {$position}

Data types 

OpenDDL defines the 15 primitive data types described in the following table. Each type has at a long name and a short name. Additionally, the floating-point types each have alternate long and short names.

Compatible Libraries 
 Official OpenDDL Library

References

External links 
Official OpenDDL website

Data serialization formats
Open formats